Mjøs is a Norwegian surname. Notable people with the surname include:

Andreas Mjøs (born 1976), Norwegian musician, record producer, and composer
Ole Danbolt Mjøs (1939–2013), Norwegian physician and politician

See also 
Marte Mjøs Persen

Norwegian-language surnames